Camp Stambaugh was a U.S. army outpost in the Wyoming Territory located in the mining district near South Pass City and Atlantic City in the Wind River Mountains.

Background
The camp was established in June 1870 to stop hostilities between miners and Native Americans and named for First Lieutenant Charles B. Stambaugh who was killed protecting settlers from a raid the month before.  The camp was established and manned by Company B of the 2nd Cavalry from Fort Bridger. Camp Stambaugh was abandoned in 1878 as the mining town populations plummeted.

References 

Stambaugh
Closed installations of the United States Army
Buildings and structures in Fremont County, Wyoming
Wyoming Territory